Harry William MacPherson (July 10, 1926 – February 19, 2017) was a right-handed pitcher who appeared in one game for the Boston Braves in 1944. At the age of 18, he was the eighth-youngest player to appear in a National League game that season. He was born in North Andover, Massachusetts.

MacPherson is one of many ballplayers who only appeared in the major leagues during World War II. On August 14, 1944, he came in to pitch the bottom of the eighth inning of a road game that the Braves lost to the Pittsburgh Pirates 5–0. Facing four batters, he allowed one walk and no runs in his one inning of work. His lifetime ERA stands at 0.00.

MacPherson served in the United States Navy during World War II. He died February 19, 2017, in Englewood, Florida.

References

External links

1926 births
2017 deaths
Major League Baseball pitchers
Baseball players from Massachusetts
Boston Braves players
United States Navy personnel of World War II
Atlanta Crackers players
Cedar Rapids Indians players
Dallas Eagles players
Denver Bears players
Hartford Chiefs players
Milwaukee Brewers (AA) players
Pawtucket Slaters players
Wichita Falls Spudders players
Wichita Indians players